The 2014 Challenge Trophy was hosted in Vaughan, Ontario from October 8–13, 2014.  It is the Canadian national championship for men's amateur soccer teams on the 4th and 5th levels of the Canadian soccer league system.

Teams

 Croatia SC 
 Calgary Callies 
 Saskatoon HUSA Alumni 
 FC Winnipeg Lions 
 London Marconi 
 Vaughan Azzurri 
 Royal Sélect de Beauport 
 Fredericton Picaroons 
 Dartmouth United Golden Goal 
 P.E.I. FC 
 Holy Cross 
 Yellowknife FC

Group stage

Group A

Standings source:

Group B

Group C

Group D

Relegation tournament
Last placed teams from the group stage were entered into a relegation round-robin tournament to determine overall classifications for 9th through 12th place.

Knockout round
The top two teams from each group in the group stage advanced to the knockout round.  All teams played three matches, as teams that lost in the knockout round still advanced to face other losing teams to determine final classifications for 3rd through 8th place.

Quarter finals

Semifinals

Finals

Winning team roster

London Marconi

Final standings

References

Challenge
Canadian National Challenge Cup